The Gate of Sun (translit. Bab el shams) is a 2004 French-Egyptian war film directed by Yousry Nasrallah. It was screened out of competition at the 2004 Cannes Film Festival.

Cast
 Hiam Abbass - Um Youness
 Fady Abou-Samra - Dr. Amgad
 Hussein Abou Seada - Colonel Mehdi
 Mohamed Akil - Responsible OLP
 Ahmad Al Ahmad - Adnan
 Vivianne Antonios - Epouse de Sameh
 Muhtaseb Aref - Sheikh Ibrahim
 Gérard Avedissian - Barman
 Antoine Balabane - Georges
 Béatrice Dalle - Catherine
 Darina El Joundi - Femme fantôme
 Maher Essam - Selim
 Hanane Hajj Ali - Zeinab
 Mohamed Hedaki - Abou Essaf
 Talal Jordy - Tortionnaire
 Bassel Khayyat - Khaleel
 Ragaa Kotrosh - Om Soliman
 Kassem Melho - Ostaz Youssef
 Orwa Nyrabia - Youness
 Hala Omran - Shams
 Nadira Omran - Um Hasan
 Bassem Samra - Interrogateur
 Wissam Smayra - Himself
 Rim Turkhi - Nahila

References

External links

2004 films
French war drama films
2000s Arabic-language films
2000s war drama films
Films directed by Yousry Nasrallah
Egyptian war drama films
2004 drama films
2000s French films